Gīwargīs of the Cross (Gīvargīs d'slīva), also spelled Geevarghese of Cross and George of Cross, was an archdeacon (arkkadyakon) and leader of the Saint Thomas Christian community of India. He was the son of the elder brother of Giwargis of Christ. By the last year of Bishop Mar Abraham, he became the Archdeacon. After the Bishop's death in 1597, he led the Indian Church. He led the church amidst Portuguese intervention. The Synod of Diamper (1599) was held during his time. In 1601, Francis Ros became Bishop, appointed by the Archbishop of Goa, Aleixo de Menezes. In the beginning there was cordiality, but the deliberate downgrading of Angamaly and the inertia of Bishop Ros frustrated him. When the Archdeacon protested, Ros excommunicated him. In 1615, the Bishop and Archdeacon reconciled each other, but again fell out later. The next Bishop, Etienne de Brito, also did not recognize the Archdeacon's ecclesiastical status. He led the church in a period of severe stress and turmoil, and held it together. After his time and his brother's time the root family of Pakalomattam became heirless. The only son shifted residence to Alappatt house. He is believed to have been buried in the forefront of Pakalomattam Thravadu (Kuravilangadu).

Synod of Diamper
In 1597, Mar Abraham, the last metropolitan archbishop appointed by the Chaldean Patriarch, died.  His Archdeacon, Givargis (of the Cross) according to the custom and by virtue of appointment of Mar Abraham, took up the administration of the Archdiocese of Angamaly. Archbishop Menezes hastened to nominate Fr. Francis Ros S.J. as administrator. At last, since the Archdeacon Givargis was well accepted by the people, Menezes had unwillingly reversed his decision and confirmed the Archdeacon as administrator. They then called together an assembly of the Saint Thomas Christians at Angamaly, in which a solemn oath was taken that they would act only according to the wishes of the Archdeacon, and that if the Pope sent them as their Bishop, not their Archdeacon, but a Latin, that they would plead their case with Rome.

Menezes undertook a visit to all the churches of the Saint Thomas Christians in February 1599, which lasted for a few months and slowly earned the good will of the people. After having won over a considerable number of people and priests, Menezes threatened to depose Archdeacon Givargis and appoint in his place Thomas Kurian, another nephew of the former Archdeacon whose claims had been ignored in 1593. In order to prevent a division, Archdeacon Givargis (of the Cross) yielded to the demands of Menezes.

See also
 India (East Syriac Ecclesiastical Province)
 Saint Thomas Christians
 Christianity in India
 Church of the East
 Mar Abraham
 Alangad
 Geevarghese of Christ

References

Saint Thomas Christians
Archdeacons
16th-century Christians
Year of birth unknown
Year of death unknown